Nine ships of the Royal Navy have been named HMS Rainbow, after the rainbow, a common meteorological phenomenon:

  was a 26-gun galleon launched in 1586.  She was rebuilt in 1602, and again in 1617 to carry 40 guns. She was reconstructed about 1630 as a second rate of 54 guns. She was sunk as a breakwater in 1680.
  was a 32-gun fifth rate captured from the French in 1697 and sold in 1698.
  was a 44-gun fifth rate launched in 1747.
  was a 16-gun brig-sloop captured from the French in 1806 and sold in 1807.
  was a 28-gun sixth rate, previously the French ship Iris.
 was a 28-gun sixth rate launched in 1823 and sold in 1838.
  was an  wood screw gunboat launched in 1856. She was used as a survey vessel from 1857, and a training ship from 1873.  She was sold in 1888.
  was an  protected cruiser launched in 1891. She was transferred to the Royal Canadian Navy in 1910. The ship was used as a depot ship from 1917 and sold her into civilian service in 1920.
  was a  launched in 1930 and sunk in a collision with the steamer Antonietta Costa in 1940.

See also
  was previously the American  . She was transferred to the Royal Canadian Navy in 1968 and was renamed HMCS Rainbow, serving until 1974.

Royal Navy ship names